Jarveon Marquai Williams (born January 3, 1995) is an American football running back free agent. Formerly of the Cincinnati Bengals of the NFL and Montreal Alouettes of the CFL. He played college football at the University of Texas at San Antonio.

Professional career
Williams signed with the Cincinnati Bengals as an undrafted free agent on May 5, 2017. He was waived on September 2, 2017 and was signed to the practice squad the next day. He was promoted to the active roster on December 16, 2017.

On August 31, 2018, Williams was waived by the Bengals.

References

External links
UTSA Roadrunners bio

1995 births
Living people
Players of American football from Texas
People from Bexar County, Texas
American football running backs
UTSA Roadrunners football players
Cincinnati Bengals players
Montreal Alouettes players
Canadian football running backs
Judson High School alumni